Pedro Cunha may refer to:

 Pedro Cunha (actor) (1980–2014), Portuguese actor
 Pedro Cunha (volleyball) (born 1983), Brazilian volleyball player